Karl-Heinz Kempf  (2 February 1920 – 3 September 1944) was a Luftwaffe fighter ace and recipient of the Knight's Cross of the Iron Cross during World War II. The Knight's Cross of the Iron Cross was awarded to recognise extreme battlefield bravery or successful military leadership.

Career
Serving with JG 21 (later JG 54) Gefreiter Kempf gained his first two victories during the Battle of France when he shot down a Hurricane on 12 May 1940, and on 26 May  a French Morane. In the Battle of Britain he achieved three additional kills, two Hurricanes and one Spitfire.

During the fighting on the Eastern Front, Kempf gradually accumulated a further 48 victories. He was awarded the Knight's Cross of the Iron Cross as an Oberfeldwebel with 7./JG 54 in February 1942. After returning to the Western Front, with JG 26 from August 1943 to September 1944 Kempf claimed twelve kills, including four four-engined bombers and three P-47 fighters.

He was shot down and wounded on 22 December 1943 and on recovery was posted to 9./JG 26 with which he claimed five victories over  the Invasion Front in June and July 1944.

Leutnant Kempf was killed on 3 September 1944, near Bael in Belgium. He was shot down by a P-51 fighter as he was taking off in Fw 190 A-8 "Black 9".

Karl-Heinz Kempf was credited with 65 kills in 445 missions, 48 of them over the Eastern Front.

Awards
 Iron Cross (1939)
 2nd Class
 1st Class
 Wound Badge in Black
 Front Flying Clasp of the Luftwaffe in Gold
 Ehrenpokal der Luftwaffe (8 July 1941)
 German Cross in Gold on 24 November 1941 as Oberfeldwebel in the 7./Jagdgeschwader 54
 Knight's Cross of the Iron Cross on 4 February 1942 as Oberfeldwebel and pilot in the 7./Jagdgeschwader 54

References

Citations

Bibliography

 
 
 

1920 births
1944 deaths
People from Waldshut (district)
People from the Republic of Baden
Luftwaffe pilots
German World War II flying aces
Recipients of the Gold German Cross
Recipients of the Knight's Cross of the Iron Cross
Luftwaffe  personnel killed in World War II
Aviators killed by being shot down
Military personnel from Baden-Württemberg